Hearts Asleep is a lost 1919 American silent crime drama film directed by Howard Hickman and produced by and starring his wife Bessie Barriscale. It was distributed through Robertson-Cole Company.

Plot
As described in a film magazine, Nancy (Barriscale) is the orphan charge of underworld fence Mother Hawkins (Dodge), but has managed to remain honest despite her patrons instructions to make her a thief. Gentleman Chi (Woodward), a notorious second story man, visits Mother Hawkins and buys her rights to Nancy, taking her with him as he goes to loot a residence. She escapes to the home of John Lewis (Whitson), who sends her to school. Gentleman Chi is caught and sent to prison for five years. Five years pass and Nancy is introduced by Lewis as his niece and moves in society until Chi, released from prison, comes to a house party and tries to force her to aid him in a contemplated theft of jewelry. She refuses, but the daughter of the host aids in the burglary and Nancy takes the blame to shield her. At the last moment the daughter confesses and saves Nancy. Lewis decides he is tired of the "uncle" role and asks Nancy to marry him, and she accepts.

Cast
Bessie Barriscale as Nancy
Vola Vale as Virginia Calvert
Frank Whitson as John Lewis
George Fisher as Randolph Lee
Henry Woodward as Gentleman Chi
Tom Guise as Andrew Calvert
Anna Dodge as Mother Hawkins

References

External links

1919 films
American silent feature films
Lost American films
Film Booking Offices of America films
American black-and-white films
American crime drama films
1919 crime drama films
Lost crime drama films
1919 lost films
1910s American films
Silent American drama films